Peter Johan Albert Antomius Andersen (17 February 1891 – 7 December 1977) was a Danish long-distance runner. He competed in the men's 10,000 metres at the 1920 Summer Olympics.

References

External links
 

1891 births
1997 deaths
Athletes (track and field) at the 1920 Summer Olympics
Danish male long-distance runners
Olympic athletes of Denmark
Olympic cross country runners